"Circle of Life" is a song from Disney's 1994 animated film The Lion King. Composed by English musician Elton John, with lyrics by Tim Rice, the song was performed by Carmen Twillie (the deep female lead vocals) and Lebo M. (opening vocals in Zulu) as the film's opening song. In an interview, Rice said he was amazed at the speed with which John composed: "I gave him the lyrics at the beginning of the session at about two in the afternoon. By half-past three, he'd finished writing and recording a stunning demo." Elton John sang a pop version (with alternative lyrics) of the song with the London Community Gospel Choir, which was included in the film's soundtrack and made into a music video.

"Circle of Life" was nominated for the Academy Award for Best Original Song in 1994, along with two other songs from The Lion King: "Hakuna Matata" and "Can You Feel the Love Tonight", the latter of which won the award. "Circle of Life" was also nominated for a Song of the Year Grammy. The song reached No. 11 in the UK and No. 18 in the US and is featured frequently in attractions based on The Lion King, such as Disney theme parks and parades. Michael Crawford sang it as part of a medley for The Disney Album in 2001.

The song was featured in Disney's 2019 photorealistic computer-animated remake of The Lion King and was used in the first trailer of the film, a near shot-for-shot remake of the opening of the original animated film. This new version of the song was performed by Brown Lindiwe Mkhize, the actress who performed as Rafiki in the stage adaptation of the movie in London from 2005 to 2018. However, the new version also retains the original Zulu opening vocals by Lebo M. from the 1994 film.

In United States, music critics praised the song's structure and its message, however in the United Kingdom, music critics' reviews on this song was mixed.

Opening of song
The song is well known for its opening line, sung by South African composer Lebo M. in Zulu. Due to the difficulty to pronounce the lyrics for English speakers, they are often mispronounced. The Zulu version of the lyrics are: 
 
Nansi ingonyama bakithi baba 
Sithi uhm ingonyama
Nansi ingonyama bakithi baba
Sithi uhhmm ingonyama
Ingonyama siyoyi nqoba
Ingonyama
Ingonyama nengwe enamabala

Which translates to English as:
Here comes a lion, father
Oh yes it’s a lion
Here comes a lion, father
Oh yes it’s a lion
A lion we’re going to conquer
A lion
A lion and a leopard come to this open place

Critical reception
Troy J. Augusto from Cash Box wrote, "Elton’s unique, radio-friendly voice and the song's powerful, dramatic production (courtesy of Chris Thomas) mean broad, immediate success as the film continues its amazing run at the box office." James Masterton commented in his weekly UK chart commentary, "Sad to relate though it is another rather unimpressive Elton John ballad, unable to stand comparison with much of his classic output and is worryingly close in places to "The One" – arguably the last single of any value he put out." Alan Jones from Music Week noted, "Elton is in philosophical mood here and has a slightly continental flavour. Publicity for The Lion King movie from which the single is taken should push it into the Top 20."

Music video
The accompanying music video for "Circle of Life" was directed by American film composer, producer and film director Richard Baskin. It was published on YouTube in November 2017. The video has amassed over 13 million views as of November 2021.

Live performances
John began to perform "Circle of Life", replacing "Can You Feel the Love Tonight", in some of his concerts, shows and performances from 1999 to 2018.

Theatrical version

Act I
In the theatrical adaptation, the opening sequence is noticeably different from the opening of the film. For example, the song is sung by Rafiki instead of an off-screen female narrator.

With the sun rising over the Pride Lands, Rafiki commences the start of the production by singing the opening chant of the song and summoning the animals of the Pride Lands for the presentation of baby Simba. As the first two verses of the musical number end, a representation of Pride Rock appears on stage carrying its two reigning rulers, Sarabi cradling the small puppet representing her son in her arms with Mufasa alongside her. As the choir chants excitedly in the background, Rafiki accompanies the monarch and his consort to the top of Pride Rock to bless the cub before raising him high in the air, singing joyfully alongside the chorus as the gathered animals bow before their new prince.

Act II
At the end of Act II, Simba's friends and family acknowledge him as the rightful king after Scar's defeat. Rafiki crowns Simba with the mantle of kingship after his victory and Simba ascends Pride Rock. There he gives a mighty roar which echoes across the whole kingdom, and the animals come back to the Pride Lands to recognise and salute Simba as the rightful king. The musical ends as Rafiki presents Simba and Nala's newborn cub to all of the animals, followed by a blackout that finishes Act II and leads to the curtain call at the end of the performance.
 
The assembly of animals that appear are slightly different from the beginning of Act I. There are no wildebeests or adult elephant, only two zebras instead of three, nine gazelles instead of twelve, and half of the bird performers instead of four. Only the baby elephant, the rhino, the giraffes, three cranes, the cheetah, and the birds appear as poles on cranes as kites.

Charts

Weekly charts

Year-end charts

Certifications

Release history

Cover versions and usage in media
The song was re-recorded in 2003 by the Disney Channel Circle of Stars, a group of actors and actresses who have appeared in Disney Channel television series and original movies, for the album Disneymania 2.  The line-up was significantly different when their next rerecording, "A Dream Is a Wish Your Heart Makes", was released two years later.

In 2017 American boyband 98° recorded a cover version of the song to help promote a re-release of The Lion King on Blu-ray as part of the Disney Signature Collection. 
The single was released as a digital download on 22 September 2017.

The song was remixed by Mat Zo which was released in the album Dconstructed on 22 April 2014.

"Circle of Life" was referenced in the song "Colors of the Wind" which was composed by Alan Menken and Stephen Schwartz for Disney's 33rd animated motion picture Pocahontas. The song's lyrics are about animism and respecting nature.

It is the main theme song for Disney's Animal Kingdom at the Walt Disney World. Epcot featured a cinema-type film called Circle of Life: An Environmental Fable from 1995 to 2018, with Timon, Pumbaa, and Simba discussing environmental topics.

At the 2011 White House Correspondents' Association, President Barack Obama jokingly claimed he was going to show his "long-form birth video", spoofing Barack Obama citizenship conspiracy theories that alleged he was born outside of the United States, rather than in his actual birthplace of Honolulu, Hawaii. The opening chant was played from the film, and Simba was seen being lifted to the skies.

New York Mets outfielder Yoenis Cespedes started using the song as his walk-up music during the 2016 Major League Baseball season.

References

Bibliography

External links
 Lion King Circle of Life Lyrics
  (official upload by DisneyMusicVEVO)

1990s ballads
1994 singles
1994 songs
Elton John songs
Grammy Award for Best Instrumental Arrangement Accompanying Vocalist(s)
Pop ballads
Disney Renaissance songs
Rock ballads
Ronan Keating songs
Song recordings produced by Chris Thomas (record producer)
Songs from The Lion King (franchise)
Songs with lyrics by Tim Rice
Songs with music by Elton John
Songs written for films
Film theme songs
Animated series theme songs
Walt Disney Records singles
Hollywood Records singles
Mercury Records singles
Macaronic songs